The 2019 Ivy League Baseball Championship Series was held at the home field of the team with the best regular season record on May 18 and 19.  The series matched the top two teams from the Ivy League's round robin regular season.  The winner of the series, Harvard, claimed the Ivy League's automatic berth in the 2019 NCAA Division I baseball tournament.

Results

Game One

Game Two

References

Ivy League Baseball Championship Series
Tournament